The Ford Explorer is a range of SUVs manufactured by Ford Motor Company since the 1991 model year. The first four-door SUV produced by Ford, the Explorer was introduced as a replacement for the two-door Bronco II. Within the current Ford light truck range, the Explorer is slotted between the Ford Edge and Ford Expedition. As with the Ford Ranger, the Explorer derives its name from a trim package previously offered on the Ford F-Series pickup trucks.

Currently, in its sixth generation, the Explorer has been offered in multiple chassis and powertrain layouts. The first two generations were directly derived from the Ford Ranger, switching to a model-specific chassis for the third and fourth generations. The fifth generation was repackaged as a CUV, adopting a variant of the Ford Taurus chassis architecture (developed for SUV use).

Alongside the five-door Explorer wagon, a three-door Explorer wagon was offered from 1991 to 2003, officially referred to as the Explorer Sport after 1999, serving as the direct replacement of the Bronco II; the 2001-2010 Ford Explorer Sport Trac was a crew-cab pickup derived from the model line. For police use, the Ford Police Interceptor Utility has been derived from the fifth and sixth-generation Explorer to replace Ford Crown Victoria Police Interceptor (and the later Taurus-based Police Interceptor Sedan). Through rebranding, Mazda, Mercury, and Lincoln have sold versions of the Explorer; Lincoln currently markets the sixth-generation model line as the Lincoln Aviator.

The first four generations of the Explorer were produced by Ford at its Louisville Assembly Plant (Louisville, Kentucky) and at its now-closed St. Louis Assembly Plant (Hazelwood, Missouri); the model line is now currently produced at Chicago Assembly (Chicago, Illinois).

In 2020, CNBC reported the Ford Explorer range as the best selling SUV of all time in America.

First generation (UN46; 1991)

The first-generation Ford Explorer was introduced in March 1990 as a 1991 model-year vehicle. While again sharing a visual commonality with the Ford Ranger, the Explorer differed significantly from its Bronco II predecessor, becoming a family-oriented vehicle with off-road capability. In a significant design change, a five-door body style joined the model line, competing against the Jeep Cherokee and Chevrolet S-10 Blazer (the Explorer and five-door S-10 Blazer were introduced within a month of each other).

To further attract family buyers, Ford aerodynamically optimized the passenger compartment of the Explorer, adopting flush-mounted glass and wraparound doors; a wider body allowed for three-across rear seating. To optimize cargo space, the traditional swing-away spare tire carrier was deleted in favor of an underfloor location. Similar to the Ford Taurus station wagon, the rear liftgate was fitted with a flip-up rear window.

Chassis 
As with the Bronco II, the first-generation Explorer (design code UN46) shares its chassis underpinnings with the 1983-1992 Ford Ranger. The three-door version uses a 102.1-inch wheelbase (8.1 inches longer than the Bronco II); the five-door uses a 111.9 wheelbase (17.9 inches longer).

Powertrain 
The Explorer was introduced with a 155 hp 4.0 L Cologne V6, replacing the 2.9L V6 of the Bronco II; the engine was shared with the Ford Aerostar and the Ranger. A Mazda M5OD 5-speed manual was the standard transmission offering, with the option of the Ford 4-speed A4LD overdrive automatic transmission.

Along with the standard rear-wheel drive powertrain, at its launch, the Explorer was also offered with various configurations of part-time four-wheel drive, powered by a Borg Warner 13–54 transfer case. The "Touch Drive" electric-shift transfer case was standard (shared with the Ranger and the previous Bronco II); it allowed the vehicle to be shifted from two-wheel drive into high-range 4x4 drive (at any speed) and into low-range 4x4 (when stopped). As an option, the Explorer was also offered with a manual-shift transfer case (the option was paired with manual-locking hubs).

All Explorers were equipped with the Ford 8.8 axle in either a limited-slip differential or open version; multiple rear-axle ratios could be specified. Four-wheel-drive front axles were the TTB ("Twin Traction Beam") Dana 35 with some Dana 44-spec components; 4x2 models shared Twin I-Beam components with the Ranger.

Body 

Shifting into the midsize SUV size class, the Explorer is far larger than the Bronco II. In comparison to its predecessor, the three-door Explorer is 12.6 inches longer and 2.2 inches wider; a five-door Explorer is 22.4 inches longer and 730 pounds heavier than the Bronco II.

Again sharing a front fascia with the Ford Ranger (including front bumper, fenders, headlamps, wheels, and grille), the passenger compartment of the Explorer underwent major upgrades over its predecessor. Alongside the addition of a five-door body style, the body underwent multiple aerodynamic upgrades; the Explorer received its own door stampings, eliminating exterior drip rails (wrapping the doors onto the roof) and bracket-mount side-view mirrors (replaced by ones integrated onto the doors). In what would become a design feature of the model line, the B-pillar and D-pillars were blacked out (visually lowering the vehicle).

The interior of the Explorer shared its dashboard with the Ranger in its entirety. In line with its own door stampings, the Explorer received model-specific door panels and interior trim. Five passenger seating was standard; on five-door versions, a front split-bench seat was offered as an option, expanding seating to six. On three-door vehicles, four-passenger seating was standard, with front bucket seats and a split-folding rear bench.

Trim 

In line with other Ford light trucks, the five-door Explorer offered two primary trim levels. The XL served as the base-level trim with XLT serving as the higher-range trim. Sharing the features of the XLT, the outdoors-themed Eddie Bauer was the highest-range trim. The XL was distinguished by a black grille (chrome optional) with steel wheels, while the XLT offered a chrome grille and alloy wheels; the Eddie Bauer offered alloy wheels and two-tone paintwork.

Alongside its five-door counterpart, the three-door Explorer offered the XL trim and Eddie Bauer trims. In place of the XLT trim, the three-door offered the Sport trim, distinguished by its black lower bodywork, grille, and standard alloy wheels. From 1991 to 1994, the Sport-trim three-door Explorer was rebranded as the Mazda Navajo (see below); the 1991 Navajo became the first SUV to win the Motor Trend Truck of the Year award.

For 1993, Ford introduced the Explorer Limited as a luxury-trim version of the model line, slotted above the Eddie Bauer. Largely intended as a competitor for the Oldsmobile Bravada, the Limited was a five-door vehicle that equipped with nearly every available feature of the model line (the only available options were a sunroof, compact disc player, and towing package). The Limited standardized several optional features introduced for the 1994 Explorer, including an anti-theft system, keyless entry, and automatic headlights. In contrast to the two-tone Eddie Bauer, the Limited was styled with a monochromatic exterior, including a color-matched grille, headlight trim, and bumpers; the alloy wheels and lower bodywork were also model-specific.

Second generation (UN105/150; 1995)

For the 1995 model year, Ford released a second generation of the Explorer. Following the success of the first generation, the redesign of the exterior was largely evolutionary, with the model line receiving front bodywork distinct from the Ranger. Rear-wheel drive remained standard, with part-time four-wheel drive offered as an option, and all-wheel drive was introduced as an option.

To better compete against the Jeep Grand Cherokee, a  V8 was introduced as an optional engine. The Explorer went from lacking airbags to having dual airbags (a first for an American-brand SUV).

The Lincoln-Mercury division introduced its first SUV for the 1997 model year, the Mercury Mountaineer. In contrast to the Mazda Navajo, the Mountaineer was sold only as a five-door. For 2001, Ford introduced the Ford Explorer Sport Trac mid-size crew-cab pickup truck based on the five-door Explorer. Following the introduction of the third-generation Explorer for 2002, the three-door used the second-generation body style through the 2003 model year.

Chassis
The second-generation Ford Explorer is based upon the Ford U1 platform shared with its predecessor, adopting the UN105/UN150 model codes. Introducing key chassis upgrades that were also shared with the 1998 Ford Ranger, the long-running Twin I-Beam/Twin Traction Beam front suspension was retired in favor of a short/long-arm (SLA) wishbone front suspension configuration in order to accommodate larger engines. Along with more compact packaging of front suspension components (allowing for a lower hoodline), the design allowed for improved on-road handling/feel. In line with the Ranger and F-Series trucks, the rear suspension remained a leaf-sprung live rear axle.

The standard four-wheel ABS of the previous generation returned; the rear drum brakes were replaced by disc brakes. As with the first generation, rear-wheel drive remained standard with part-time four-wheel drive as an option; all-wheel drive became an option for the first time.

Powertrain

The second generation Explorer carried over its 160 hp 4.0 L V6 from the previous generation (shared with the Ranger and Aerostar). For 1996, largely to match the V8 engine offerings of the Jeep Grand Cherokee and Land Rover Discovery, a   V8 (marketed as 5.0 L) was introduced as an option for rear-wheel drive XLT five-doors.

For 1997, a third engine was added to the model line, as Ford introduced an overhead-cam version of the 4.0 L Cologne V6. Differing from its predecessor primarily by its single-overhead-cam drivetrain, the 210 hp engine rivaled the V8 in output. Introduced as standard equipment for Eddie Bauer and Limited trims, by 1998, the engine became offered on all non-XL trims. For 2001, the overhead-valve version of the 4.0 L V6 was discontinued, with the SOHC engine becoming standard (and the only engine of the Explorer Sport).

Following the introduction of the overhead-cam Triton-series V8s for the 1997 Ford F-Series and E-Series, the 2001 Explorer would be the final Ford Motor Company vehicle in North America sold with an overhead-valve gasoline-powered V8 engine for nearly two decades (until the 2020 introduction of the 7.3 L Godzilla V8 for Super Duty trucks).

For 2000, Ford added flex-fuel capability to the Explorer for the first time. The flex-fuel SOHC V6 and chassis were mated to an aluminum body built by Utilimaster in the Ford-Utilimaster FFV, a delivery vehicle built for the United States Postal Service in 2000 and 2001.

A Mazda-produced 5-speed manual was standard with the 4.0 L OHV V6 engine; the SOHC V6 was not offered with a manual transmission until 2000, receiving a heavier-duty version of the Mazda-sourced 5-speed. The V6 Explorers initially received a 4-speed automatic, shared with the Ranger and Aerostar, adopting a 5-speed automatic for 1997. The  V8 was paired only with a 4-speed heavy-duty automatic (shared with the F-150, Crown Victoria/Grand Marquis, and Lincoln Mark VIII).

For the second-generation Explorer, the four-wheel drive system underwent a redesign. The previous Touch-Drive system (electrically operated) was retired and replaced by ControlTrac, an electronically controlled full-time four-wheel drive system with a two-speed transfer case; in place of a center differential, software-controlled multi-disc clutch. Similar to the previous push-button Touch-Drive system, a rotary dash selector was used for driver input, selecting two-wheel drive (rear wheels), and four-wheel drive (high and low range). As an intermediate mode, "Auto" mode allowed software to control the torque sent to the front wheels; if the front axle began to spin, torque was shifted from the rear wheels to the front wheels until traction is achieved. The manually operated hubs and manual transfer cases were discontinued.

Similar to the system used on the Aerostar van, the V8 Explorer used a full-time all-wheel drive system without separate high or low ranges. The all-wheel drive's torque distribution was via a viscous clutch with a 40/60 split.

Body 
While bearing an evolutionary resemblance to the previous generation, nearly the entire body underwent a change, with only the roof and the side door stampings carried over. Coinciding with the lower hoodline allowed by the redesigned front suspension, much of the body was distinguished by a restyled front fascia, introducing a styling theme used by several other Ford light trucks during the late 1990s. The Ford Blue Oval was centered in a now-oval grille, joined by oval headlamp clusters wrapping into the fenders. In contrast to the front fascia, the rear body saw relatively few changes, receiving mildly restyled taillamps (with amber turn signals). In a functional change, the Explorer received a neon CHMSL (center brake light), adopted from the Lincoln Mark VIII.

While again directly sharing its dashboard with the Ranger, the interior of the Explorer underwent a complete redesign (allowing for the fitment of dual airbags). To improve driver ergonomics, the instrument panel received larger gauges, rotary-style climate controls, and a double-DIN radio panel.

For 1997, export-market Explorers received a third-row seat as an option (expanding seating to seven passengers).

For 1998, Ford gave the exterior of the model line a mid-cycle revision. Distinguished by body-color rear D-pillars and larger taillamps, the rear license plate was relocated from the rear bumper to the liftgate (to better accommodate export); the neon CHMSL was replaced by an LED version. In another change, 16-inch wheels were introduced.

The interior received redesigned front and rear seats; alongside second-generation dual airbags, side airbags were introduced (as an option). Other options included load-leveling air suspension (on Eddie Bauer and Limited) and a reverse-sensing warning system. The rarely-specified 60/40 front bench seat was restricted to fleet vehicles after 1998 and was discontinued for 2000.

For 1999, the front bumper underwent a second revision, adding a larger cooling inlet and standard fog lights. All three-door Explorers were now renamed to "Explorer Sport.

For 2001, the three-door Explorer Sport underwent an additional revision, adopting the front fascia of the Explorer Sport Trac pickup truck. 

For 2002, the five-door body style would be replaced by an all new Explorer, with only the three-door Explorer Sport and Sport Trac maintaining the second-generation architecture. Styling changes for the Sport are minimal, with the rear wiper moving from the tailgate assembly to being built into the rear window.

Trim 

At its launch, the second-generation Ford Explorer retained the use of the previous trim nomenclature; the standard trim was the XL, with the XLT serving as the primary model upgrade. Along with the two-tone Eddie Bauer trim, the highest trim Explorer was the monochromatic Ford Explorer Limited. For 2000, XLS replaced XL as the base trim (introduced as an appearance package for 1999).

In contrast to five-door Explorers, second-generation three-door Ford Explorers shifted to a separate trim nomenclature. While the XL remained the base model (largely for fleets), most examples were produced under a single Sport trim level (again equipped similarly to the XLT). For 1995, Ford replaced the 3-door Eddie Bauer with the Expedition trim; in anticipation of the full-size Ford Expedition SUV, the trim line was withdrawn for the 1996 model year.

For 1999, all three-door Explorers became Explorer Sports; the model was produced alongside the third-generation Explorer through the 2003 model year.

Epilogue 

Outside of North America, this generation of the Explorer was marketed in right-hand drive configurations. As of 2018, RHD countries (such as Japan) export used examples of the Explorer to other countries (such as Australia and New Zealand) where there is demand for right-hand drive SUVs. Due to Japan's strict Shaken Laws, used vehicles tend to have low mileage with detailed repair histories.

In the United States, the second-generation Ford Explorer has the (dubious) distinction of being two of the top five vehicles traded-in under the 2009 "Cash for Clunkers" program, with the 4WD model topping the list and the 2WD model coming in at number 4.

Third generation (U152; 2002)

The third-generation Ford Explorer went on sale in January 2001 for the 2002 model year. Undergoing the first complete redesign since its introduction, the Explorer ended its direct model commonality with the Ford Ranger in favor of a purpose-built SUV design. Following a decline in demand for three-door SUVs, Ford developed the third-generation Explorer solely as a five-door wagon; the three-door Explorer Sport from the second generation continued production through the 2003 model year.

The primary objective behind the development of the model line was to make the Explorer more competitive in both domestic and export markets. Along with tuning the vehicle for higher-speed European driving, Ford also benchmarked the model line against the Lexus RX300 and the (then-in-development) Volkswagen Touareg. The Lincoln-Mercury division marketed the third-generation Explorer, with Mercury introducing a second generation of the Mercury Mountaineer; Lincoln offered its first version of the Explorer, marketing the Lincoln Aviator from 2003 to 2005.

Chassis 
The third-generation Explorer (design code U152) marked a major change in the model line, ending chassis commonality with the Ford Ranger. While still retaining body-on-frame construction, the U152 chassis was developed specifically for the third-generation Explorer (and its Lincoln-Mercury counterparts). The wheelbase was extended slightly, to 113.7 inches. Along with rear-wheel drive, the third-generation Explorer was offered with both four-wheel drive and permanent all-wheel drive.

Following the redesign of the front suspension of the previous-generation Explorer, Ford redesigned the suspension layout of the rear axle, replacing the leaf-sprung live rear axle with an independent rear axle located by two half-shafts (similar to the Ford MN12 chassis). The 4-wheel independent configuration was a first for Ford Motor Company trucks and American-market SUVs (with the exception of the HMMWV-derived Hummer H1). As with the previous generation, four-wheel disc brakes were standard with an anti-lock braking system.

Powertrain 
Carried over from the previous generation, a 210 hp 4.0 L V6 was the standard engine. The 5.0 L V8 of the previous generation was retired, with the Explorer adopting a 239 hp 4.6 L Modular V8 as its optional engine (shared with the Ford Crown Victoria/Mercury Grand Marquis); the Explorer was the final V8-powered American Ford to adopt the 4.6 L engine.

For 2002, a 5-speed manual transmission was standard equipment with the 4.0 L V6, the final year a manual transmission was offered for the model line. From 2003 to 2005, the Ford 5R55 5-speed automatic transmission (previously optional for the 4.0 L V6) was paired with the 4.0 L V6 and the 4.6 L V8.

Body 

In contrast with the second-generation Ford Explorer (a major revision of the first-generation model line), the third-generation Ford Explorer was a ground-up redesign (ending all body commonality with the Ford Ranger). Offered solely as a five-door wagon, the model line returned several exterior design elements from previous-generation Explorers (blacked-out B and D-pillars, quarter glass in the rear doors); the grille and taillights were elements adopted from the larger Ford Expedition. The 2002 Ford Explorer introduced a design theme adopted by multiple Ford vehicles, including the 2003 Ford Expedition, the 2004 Ford Freestar, and the 2005 Ford Freestyle wagon and Five Hundred sedan.

Proportioned nearly identically the same as the previous two generations, the third-generation Explorer was an inch shorter, two inches wider, and two inches longer in wheelbase. Several functional changes were brought to the Explorer as part of the rear suspension redesign. The change allowed for a lower rear cargo floor, adding nearly 10 cubic feet of additional cargo space. Offered on nearly all versions, a folding third-row seat was offered as either standard equipment or as an option (expanding seating to seven passengers). For 2004, a rear-bucket seat configuration became an option for higher-trim models, including a second center console (reducing seating to six). Following the design of previous generations, the third-generation Explorer again received a multi-opening rear liftgate, enlarging the rear window opening (covered partially by a filler panel, housing the rear windshield washer).

Trim 

For the 2002 model year, the third-generation Ford Explorer adopted the trim nomenclature of its predecessor. The base trim of the model line was the XLS (intended largely for fleet sale) with the newly introduced XLS Sport, which standardized many options offered for the XLS. The primary trim level of the Explorer was the XLT, split into two versions; the standard XLT received a monochromatic exterior and the XLT Sport received gray lower-body trim and 17-inch wheels. The Eddie Bauer and Limited returned as the highest-trim versions of the Explorer, with the Eddie Bauer distinguished by tan lower-body trim; the Limited was styled with a body-color exterior.

For 2003 and 2004, Ford marketed the Explorer NBX trim. Equipped between the XLT and Eddie Bauer/Limited, the Explorer NBX was an off-road oriented version of the Explorer equipped with all-terrain tires, black bumpers and body cladding, heavy-duty roof rack, and custom seat trim. The NBX was also offered with an Off-Road option package; offered with any four-wheel drive Explorer, the option featured skid plates, tow hooks, and upgraded suspension.

Safety 
Undergoing development during the late 1990s, the third-generation Explorer adopted safety features in response to the tread separation controversy that affected the previous-generation model line. Along with the deletion of the Firestone Wilderness AT tires, to further reduce rollover risk, the front and rear axles were widened (the latter, coinciding with the introduction of independent rear suspension). As an option, AdvanceTrac was introduced as a stability control system. For 2005, AdvanceTrac was redesigned, becoming AdvanceTrac RSC (Roll Stability Control); included as a standard feature, the system used ABS, traction control, stability control, and yaw control to reduce rollover risk.

In addition to standard dual front-seat airbags, seatbelt pretensioners were added; side-curtain airbags became an option on all versions of the model line.

Fourth generation (U251; 2006)

The Ford Explorer and the Mercury Mountaineer were both updated for the 2006 model year on a new frame, produced by Magna International rather than Tower Automotive. Along with this new, stronger chassis, Ford updated the interior, redesigned the rear suspension and added optional power-folding third-row seats. Also, a tire pressure monitoring system and electronic stability control became standard equipment. In 2007 power-deployable running boards, like the ones from the Lincoln Navigator, were also made available for Eddie Bauer and Limited trims on the Explorer and the Premier trim on the Mountaineer; the running boards lower to allow easier access when entering the vehicle, then retract upon door closure. Unlike previous generations, there was no right-hand drive option available for order, causing Ford to market Explorers in Japan in left-hand drive configuration. The LHD Explorers were desirable there because LHD vehicles are considered prestigious in Japan. Moreover, Ford switched to a one-piece rear liftgate design due to the problems associated with the previous generation's design.

This generation Explorer would be the last to use body on frame construction as future Explorers, beginning in 2011, would use unibody construction. Additionally, it was the last generation to be produced in Louisville, Kentucky.

The  4.0 L 12-valve SOHC V6 was once again the standard engine. The  4.6 L 24-valve SOHC V8, similar to the Fifth-generation Ford Mustang's engine, was available as an option. The 6-speed 6R automatic transmission, built by Ford and based on a ZF design, was made standard equipment with the V8 engine as well. The five-speed 5R55W automatic transmission was advanced and became the 5R55S. It was the only transmission available for the V6 engine, because the Mazda five-speed manual transmission was dropped in the previous generation.

The 2006 Ford Explorer was nominated for the North American Truck of the Year award for 2006.

The fourth generation Explorer was the last generation to also have a Mercury Mountaineer counterpart as Mercury was dissolved in 2011.

Model year changes
For 2007, The Explorer received a few minor updates including a standard AUX input on all stereos, optional power running boards, a heated windshield, Ironman Package, XLT Appearance Package, and heated leather seat package. The XLS trim was also dropped for 2007, and the XLT became the base model. Additionally, the leather-wrapped steering wheel, power driver seat, and dual illuminated vanity mirrors were deleted as standard equipment on the XLT trim. Side curtain airbags were optional on Eddie Bauer and Limited trims, while XLT models were only available with seat-mounted side torso airbags. The Ford Explorer Sport Trac was also re-introduced for the 2007 model year after skipping 2006.

For 2008, Ford added standard side curtain airbags on all Explorers. The 2008 Ford Explorer also became the first Ford vehicle to utilize the cap-less fuel filler system, though Explorers were not equipped with it until mid-year 2008. Three new colors were added for the 2008 model year: Stone Green clearcoat metallic, Vapor Silver clearcoat metallic, and White Suede clearcoat metallic. All Explorers now came standard with body-color fender lip and bumper cladding, while Eddie Bauer models received standard Pueblo Gold cladding. The AdvanceTrac badge on the trunk door was replaced with a "4X4" badge on 4WD models. In a reversal from the 2007 model year, a leather-wrapped steering wheel with audio controls, a power driver seat, and dual illuminated vanity mirrors were once again standard on the XLT. In addition to this, XLT models also now received faux carbon-fiber trim on the window switches, puddle lights, and a standard overhead console. Furthermore, Ford SYNC was now optional on all Ford Explorer models and the optional satellite navigation system was upgraded with voice control. The Ironman appearance package was dropped after the 2008 model year.

For 2009, the Explorer received a trailer sway control system as standard equipment, and the navigation system received traffic flow monitoring with updated gas prices from nearby stations. Revised front headrests were also standard for the 2009 model year.

For the 2010 model year, Ford's MyKey became standard on all Explorers equipped with the Sync system, while V8s were restricted to 4-wheel-drive models.

The last fourth generation Explorer rolled off the assembly line on December 16, 2010.

Engine specifications

Explorer Ironman
In 2005, Ford signed a three-year deal to sponsor the Ironman Triathlon. Ford Explorer marketing manager Glen Burke compared the Explorer and the Ironman Triathlon; noting that both had the same attributes of strength, endurance, and passion. The Explorer Ironman debuted on June 25, 2006, for the 2007 model year was an interior and exterior appearance package for the XLT trim. It featured a blacked-out front grille, a protruding silver lower grille with rivet patterns and "Ironman" embossing, a unique rear fascia, Ironman badging, smoked headlights, amber fog lights, blacked-out fender flares with rivet patterns, and unique 18-inch wheels. The interior featured unique heated ten-way power-adjustable two-tone black and stone leather seats, as well as silver trim around the radio and climate controls. Additionally, a leather-wrapped steering wheel was standard. The Explorer Ironman was available in only five colors: Oxford White, Ebony, Redfire, Silver Birch, as well as Orange Frost; which was a unique color only available with the Ironman package. The Ironman could be had with either the standard 4.0 L SOHC V6 or the 4.6 L V8, and in either standard RWD or 4WD configurations. The Explorer Ironman went on sale in September 2006 as a 2007 model, and it was discontinued after the 2008 model year.

Ford Explorer Sport Trac
The second generation Sport Trac came out in early 2006 for the 2007 model year. Unlike its predecessor sold through 2005, it featured the V8 engine as an option and was based on this generation Explorer's platform. AdvanceTrac with Roll Stability Control was made standard on the Sport Trac.

Sport Trac Adrenalin
 
The model was planned by Ford SVT to be the successor to the F-150 Lightning sports pickup truck. However, the SVT version of the Adrenalin was cancelled in a cost-cutting move as part of The Way Forward. The Adrenalin was subsequently sold as an appearance package from 2007 to 2010. It had blacked-out headlights, black grill, monochrome color interior, unique front and rear bumpers, front fender vents, and molded-in running boards. It also came standard with 20-inch polished aluminum wheels, and the fender flares that came on the Explorer and standard Sport Trac were deleted.

Explorer America concept

Ford unveiled an Explorer America concept vehicle at the 2008 North American International Auto Show. The Explorer America concept is built on a unibody platform to reduce weight and improve driveability, migrating from the body-on-frame platform of the fourth generation Explorer. It is designed for up to six passengers while improving fuel economy by 20 to 30 percent relative to the current V6 Explorer.

Fifth generation (U502; 2011)

The fifth generation 2011 Explorer bears similarity to the Explorer America concept's construction, and includes a unibody structure based on the D4 platform, a modified version of the D3 platform. The move from traditional SUV to crossover effectively vacated the midsize SUV segment for Ford until the sixth generation Bronco arrived, which debuted in July 2020.

The fifth generation Explorer features blacked-out A, B, and D-pillars to produce a floating roof effect similar to Land Rover's floating roof design used on its sport utility vehicles; Ford previously used that design on the Ford Flex. The fifth generation Explorer features sculpted body work with stepped style headlamps similar to the Flex, Edge, Escape, Expedition and F-150, as well as new stepped style tail lamps. The grille features Ford's corporate three-bar design with upper and lower perforated mesh work, similar to that of the sixth-generation Ford Taurus.

The development of the fifth generation Explorer was led by chief engineer Jim Holland from February 2008 to October 2010. He was also a chief engineer for Land Rover, heading development of the Land Rover Range Rover (L322) 2005 facelift from December 2001 to December 2004. Holland also worked on the Ford Expedition (U324) during its initial development.

The fifth generation Explorer made its debut online on July 26, 2010. Ford had set up a Ford Explorer Facebook page ahead of its debut. Assembly of the fifth-generation Explorer moved to Ford's Chicago Assembly plant commencing December 1, 2010, where it was built alongside the Ford Taurus and Lincoln MKS. The Louisville plant, where the previous generation was built, was converted to produce cars based on Ford's global C platform (potentially including the Ford Focus, Ford C-Max, and Ford Kuga). Like the Escape, the Explorer continued to be marketed as an "SUV" rather than a "crossover SUV". It went on sale in December 2010, after pre-launch sales had by the end of November 2010 totaled around 15,000. The EPA rated fuel economy of 20/28 mpg city/highway for the four-cylinder EcoBoost engine option.

Features
Available features on the fifth generation Explorer included intelligent access with push button start, remote engine start, power liftgate, power adjustable pedals with memory, premium leather trimmed seating, heated and cooled front seats, dual headrest DVD entertainment system, adaptive cruise control, active park assist, SIRIUS Travel Link, MyFord Touch, Ford SYNC by Microsoft, Sony audio system with HD radio and Apple iTunes tagging, in-dash advanced navigation system, SoundScreen laminated acoustic and solar tinted windshield with rain-sensing wipers, 20-inch polished V-spoke aluminium wheels, and High-intensity discharge headlamps (HID) and LED tail lamps.

Unlike the Explorer America concept vehicle which only seats five occupants, the production Explorer holds two rows of seating with available PowerFold fold-flat third-row seating (like the previous generation) and accommodates up to seven occupants.

Capability
The Explorer was available in either front-wheel drive or full-time all-wheel drive.

Soon thereafter, Ford offered the economical  ( of torque) 2 L EcoBoost turbocharged, direct-injected I-4 mated to the 6-speed 6F automatic. The I-4 engine was not available with the optional 6-speed 6F SelectShift automatic, and was only available in front-wheel drive.

The Explorer was available with an automatic intelligent all-wheel drive system inspired by Land Rover, featuring a variable center multi-disc differential with computer controlled lock. Conventional front and rear differentials are used with 3.39:1 gearing. The center multi-disc differential controls the front-to-rear torque split, biasing as much as 100 percent of torque to either the front or rear wheels. Depending on the Terrain Management mode selected, the center multi-disc differential's intelligent lock will allow for a 50:50 torque split in off-road conditions. The power take off (PTO) unit includes a heavy-duty dedicated cooling system to allow the four-wheel drive system to supply continuous non-stop torque delivery to all four wheels indefinitely, without overheating. A "4WD" badge is advertised on the rear liftgate on the all-wheel drive models. Explorer's overall off-road crawl ratio is 15.19:1 with high range – no low range – gearing only.

Off-road electronics include Hill Descent Control (HDC), Hill Ascent Assist (HAA), four-wheel electronic traction control and Terrain Management.

Four-wheel electronic traction control (ABS braking) is employed to simulate front and rear differential locks via aggressively "brake locking" the front or rear differentials, transferring up to 100 percent of torque from side-to-side. In the right conditions, the Explorer can keep moving even if only one wheel has traction, regardless of which wheel it is.

Terrain Management includes four selectable modes. Each mode is selected via a rotary control dial on the center console, aft of the transmission shifter.

Depending on the mode selected, Terrain Management will control, adjust, and fine-tune the engine, transmission, center multi-disc differential lock, throttle response, four-wheel electronic traction control and electronic stability control (ESC) to adapt the SUV for optimal performance on the corresponding terrain.

Off-road geometry figures for approach, departure and ramp breakover angles are 21°, 21° and 16° respectively. Low hanging running boards are no longer offered from the factory to help increase side obstacle clearance.

Moving to a monocoque body usually has a negative impact on towing capacity. The new Explorer will be available with an optional trailer tow package. The package includes a Class III trailer hitch, engine oil cooler, trailer electrics connector, trailer sway control (TSC), wiring harness and a rear-view camera with trailer alignment assistance to help in backing up to a trailer. That is  greater than the towing capacity stated for the Explorer America concept and  less than the outgoing Explorer's towing capacity, although that was only available with the 4.6 L V8 engine.

Safety and security
Safety features include: Dual front adaptive SRS airbags, dual front-seat side-impact airbags, dual rear safety belt airbags (beginning first quarter, 2011), and side curtain head, torso and rollover protection airbags. Other optional safety features include BLIS blind spot information system with rear cross traffic alert, forward collision warning with brake support precrash system, Auto high-beam, Roll Stability Control (RSC), Electronic stability control (ESC) and Curve Control.

The fifth-generation Explorer was the first-ever vehicle to be equipped with dual rear inflatable safety belts. Airbags are sewn into the inside of the seat belts, and inflate with cold air to prevent burns. Ford claims it will be released as an option and to introduce inflatable seat belts on other Ford models eventually.

Global recall
On June 12, 2019, Ford announced a global recall of 1.2 million Explorers produced from 2011 to 2017 citing suspension issues. Ford stated if the car was subjected to frequent rides over rough terrain that the toe link on the rear suspension could fracture which would affect steering and lead to greater risks of traffic accidents.

NHTSA

*vehicle structure rated "Poor"

Awards
The fifth generation Ford Explorer earned the 2011 North American Truck of the Year award. The rear inflatable seat belts won the 2011 Best New Technology Award from the Automobile Journalists Association of Canada.

2013 Ford Explorer Sport

The Ford Explorer Sport was announced on March 28, 2012, as an option for the 2013 model year and went on sale in June 2012. It was at the time the only version to feature a combined 4WD/EcoBoost option (an FWD version is not being offered for the Sport trim; 2016+ facelifted models offered the 2.3• EcoBoost with 4WD), allowing its MPG to average between 16/city and 22/highway. This version was slotted above the Limited trim and competed against Jeep Grand Cherokee's SRT trim and Dodge Durango's R/T trims and a newly updated 2013 Chevrolet Traverse, the latter of which unveiled their new look on the same day as the Explorer Sport as their response to Ford's news.

2016 facelift

The refreshed 2016 model year Ford Explorer debuted at the 2014 Los Angeles Auto Show, with a redesigned front fascia, hood, and lower bumper, standard LED low-beam headlights, and fog lamps that were inspired by the thirteenth generation Ford F-150. The rear of the Explorer was also refreshed with restyled LED tail lamps and dual exhaust outlets. The 2016 refresh bumped the I4 engine to a 2.3 L EcoBoost four-cylinder engine from the 2015 Ford Mustang. A newly introduced Platinum trim now tops out the range, slotting above the Sport and Limited trims. Similar to the Platinum editions of the F150 and Ford Super Duty trucks, the Platinum trim features front and rear cameras, enhanced active park assist with perpendicular park assist, park-out assist and semi-automatic parallel parking, hands-free liftgate from the Ford Escape, an exclusive 500-watt Sony surround sound system, and a heated steering wheel. The 2016 Explorer went on sale at dealerships in the middle of 2015. The base Explorer also received standard eighteen-inch alloy wheels.

2018 and 2019 updates
For 2018, the fifth-generation Ford Explorer received a front fascia update including new front LED fog lights (not available on the base model Explorer) and a new grille design. Also added was an optional Ford Safe and Smart Package (standard on Platinum models), which gives customers several of Ford's safety features, and the Explorer Sport and Platinum received new quad-exhaust tips.

In 2019, the Explorer received one last update before it would be completely redesigned for the sixth-generation Explorer. Explorer XLT models received an optional XLT Desert Copper Package, priced at an additional US$1,840. The package included an ebony interior with copper inserts, chrome mirror caps, and 20” Polished Aluminum wheels. Explorer Limited models also received an optional Limited Luxury Package, priced at an additional $1,905. The package included upgraded premium leather seats with unique stitching, premium leather wrapped steering wheel and door inserts, multi-contour with massage capability driver and passenger front seats, inflatable passenger seat belts, chrome mirror caps, and 20” aluminum wheels. These Explorer packages were introduced to celebrate Ford's new record SUV sales at the State Fair of Texas where two Ford Expedition packages (Expedition Stealth Edition and Texas Edition) were also revealed alongside the Explorer.

Engines

Sixth generation (U625; 2020) 

The sixth-generation Ford Explorer officially debuted on January 9, 2019, ahead of the 2019 North American International Auto Show. The 2020 Ford Explorer is built on the new rear-wheel-drive based CD6 platform shared with the new Lincoln Aviator.

It comes with a new 10-speed automatic transmission and either rear- or all-wheel drive.

An Explorer Hybrid is also available in the US with a detuned 3.3 L V6 and 1.5 kWh lithium-ion battery producing a combined .

The 2020 Explorer comes in four trim levels: XLT, Limited, ST, and Platinum. The base Explorer will be sold mainly to fleet buyers, and will not be available for retail sale.

Thousands of initial Explorer and Aviator vehicles were shipped to Ford's Flat Rock Assembly Plant for repairs due to quality control problems. Later models have been shipped from the Chicago plant to dealerships; however, many required dealer repairs before they could be sold. Consumer Reports noted their purchased Aviator was having quality problems.

2022 model year

For the 2022 model year, a rear-wheel drive version of the Explorer ST became available, as did a hybrid version of the range-topping Platinum. The XLT gained a new Appearance Package with unique aluminum-alloy wheels and seating surfaces. Added mid-year 2021, the Timberline trim is based on the mid-level XLT, and adds unique heathered cloth and ActiveX (leatherette)-trimmed seating surfaces, all-terrain tires, and unique exterior and interior styling details. A new ST Line trim, also based on the mid-level XLT, adds exterior and interior styling elements from the performance-oriented ST, but does not include the 3.0L EcoBoost twin-turbocharged V6 engine, and is instead powered by the base 2.3L EcoBoost inline four-cylinder engine. The ST Line offers an optional Bang and Olufsen premium surround sound audio system with an external amplifier, which was previously only offered on Limited trims and above.

Engines

Chinese market
The Chinese market Ford Explorer received a facelift for the 2023 model year and was unveiled in August 2022, with orders received from August 11, and production kicking off on November 7. The facelift is exclusive to the Chinese market with revised front and rear end designs and the dashboard now accommodates a  27-inch touchscreen.

Variants

3-door / Explorer Sport 
As the direct successor of the Bronco II, Ford developed a three-door version of the Explorer for the 1991 model year; while 10 inches shorter than its five-door counterpart, the three-door was still nearly 13 inches longer than the Bronco II. For the first generation, the three-door was available in XL, Sport, and Eddie Bauer trims, with Sport offered as a trim exclusive to the three-door, distinguished by black-colored wheel wells and rocker panels. For 1995, Expedition was offered as a trim package for the three-door Explorer; replacing the Eddie Bauer trim, the nameplate was retired after 1995 in preparation for the 1997 full-size four-door SUV.

During the second generation, the XL trim was retired for the 1999 model year, with all three-door Explorers becoming Explorer Sports. For 2001, the Explorer Sport was split from the five-door Explorer, retaining the second-generation body and chassis and adopting the front fascia and interior of the Explorer Sport Trac. 

Ford discontinued the Explorer Sport following the 2003 model year with no direct replacement due to the declining popularity of three-door SUVs, with the final vehicle produced in July 2003.

Ford Explorer Sport Trac 

Introduced in 2000 as a 2001 model, the Explorer Sport Trac is a mid-size pickup truck derived from the second-generation Explorer, becoming the first mid-size Ford pickup. In contrast to the Ranger, the Sport Trac was marketed primarily as a personal-use vehicle rather than for work use.

Offered solely as a four-door crew cab, the design of the Sport Trac shared commonality with multiple vehicles. Sharing the frame and wheelbase of the Ranger SuperCab, the Sport Trac combined the front fascia of the Explorer Sport with a crew cab derived from the four-door Explorer; the pickup bed (designed for the model line) shared its tailgate with the F-150 SuperCrew.

The 2001-2005 Sport Trac was the final version of the Explorer derived from the Ranger. After skipping the 2006 model year, a second-generation Sport Trac was produced from 2007 until 2010 (derived from the fourth-generation Explorer).

Ford Police Interceptor Utility 

Following the end of production of the Ford Crown Victoria Police Interceptor (CVPI) in 2011, Ford developed two new models to replace it, as part of their Ford Police Interceptor range. For the 2013 model year, Ford introduced the Taurus-based Ford Police Interceptor Sedan (FPIS) and Explorer-based Ford Police Interceptor Utility (FPIU). Both models were designed & assembled alongside each other and were platform mates. As such, many mechanical parts, repair techniques, specifications, and vehicle interfaces were intentionally the same between the two vehicles to facilitate easier repairs and user familiarity. Like the CVPI, the Ford Expedition SSV, and the Taurus-based FPIS, the FPIU was not made available for retail sale.

Unlike the outgoing CVPI and the Expedition SSV, the FPIU was unavailable with a V8 engine. Instead, it was equipped with a 3.7 L Cyclone V6 used in the Ford Mustang, but in a transverse arrangement as the standard engine. Permanent torque-vectoring all-wheel drive was standard across the line. All iterations of the FPIU used a variant of Ford's 6F six-speed automatic transmission.

Visually, the FPIU could be easily told apart from a standard Ford Explorer. It featured a black front grille with black exterior trim, black steel wheels with chrome center caps or plastic hubcaps, a keyhole on the trunk door, Police Interceptor badging on the trunk door, and no roof rails. The EcoBoost FPIU featured several distinct visual cues that set it apart from its non-turbocharged counterpart. The EcoBoost variant featured a different grille, similar to that of the FPIS, large INTERCEPTOR badging across the hood lip, and an EcoBoost badge on the trunk.
 
Many standard features that were fitted to the FPIU were not available on the standard Ford Explorer, including  rear impact protection; a police calibrated ECM for high performance driving & long idling times; a heavy duty cooling system that included a larger radiator, an engine oil cooler, transmission cooler, power transfer unit (PTU) cooler, and police-calibrated radiator fan settings; a 220-amp alternator; heavy duty 13-inch brake rotors with special ventilation & 18-inch five spoke steel wheels; true dual exhaust; a police-tuned suspension with heavy duty components; raised ride height; steel deflector plates along the underbody; reinforced frame points; reinforced front door hinges; factory provisions to add emergency equipment, and a specially tuned electronic stability control system tailored to emergency style driving. Interior-wise, the FPIU differentiated from the standard Ford Explorer, featuring a column shifter as opposed to a floor shifter, mappable steering wheel controls, a certified-calibration speedometer, heavy-duty cloth front seats with stab-proof front seat backs, a vinyl rear seat without headrests, vinyl flooring, and the ability to disable the rear door locks and window switches. A third-row seating option was not available on the FPIU. Some features found on a standard Ford Explorer were available as standalone options on the FPIU, such as Ford SYNC, a rearview camera, reverse sensors, blind spot monitoring, keyless entry, exterior fog lamps, automatic headlights, and rear headliner mounted HVAC vents.

The Ford Police Interceptor Utility proved to be popular outseling the FPIS, and became ubiquitous with law enforcement as the CVPI was being phased out. The California Highway Patrol began to use the Police Interceptor Utility as a CVPI replacement because the FPIS, Chevrolet Caprice, and Dodge Charger patrol cars did not meet the payload the CHP requires for a universal patrol car. In May 2014, statistician R.L. Polk declared the FPIU the most popular police vehicle, based on 2013 U.S. sales figures.

For the 2016 model year, the FPIU was refreshed along with the rest of the Explorer line. Though powertrain options remained the same, the FPIU received an upgraded electrical system, a new front fascia with LED reflector headlights, a new rear fascia, and an unlock button on the trunk. Inside, the FPIU received a new steering wheel, new interior trim, and a revised center stack. The electronic stability control system was re-tuned to allow for J-turns. A perimeter alarm was introduced as an option that automatically locked the doors and closed the windows if anyone attempted to approach the vehicle from its blind spots.

Second generation

For the 2020 model year, Ford released a second-generation Police Interceptor Utility, derived from the sixth-generation Explorer. Offered exclusively in a permanent all-wheel drive configuration, it now rides on Ford's all-new rear-wheel drive based CD6 platform. The second generation FPIU does not have a sedan counterpart, as the Ford Police Interceptor Sedan was discontinued in 2019.

Many of the same Utility-specific standard features were carried over from the first-generation version. For the first time, the FPIU was offered in a hybrid drivetrain configuration. Bluetooth is now standard as is a 250 amp alternator, Ford Telematics, and dual-zone front temperature control. A 12.1-inch center stack display is now optional, and the optional perimeter alarm has been advanced. The second generation FPIU gains cargo space (even with hybrid batteries on board) over its predecessor.

All iterations of the second-generation FPIU use a 10-speed automatic transmission.

The new hybrid system is based on Ford's fourth-generation modular hybrid system, which shares up to 90% of its parts with the Escape Hybrid and F-150 Hybrid. It is estimated that the hybrid drivetrain will save departments between $3,500 and $5,700 a year per vehicle in fuel costs.

Ford Police Interceptor Utility Performance Specs (based on Michigan State Police testing):

Mazda Navajo 

The first-generation Ford Explorer was sold by Mazda from 1991 until 1994 as the Mazda Navajo. Offered solely in a three-door configuration, only minor design details differed the Navajo from its Ford counterpart.

In the early 1990s, SUVs transitioned into alternatives to station wagons, leading to a decline in demand for two-door SUVs. After the 1994 model year, Mazda withdrew the Navajo, returning in 2000 with the four-door Tribute (a counterpart of the Ford Escape).

Mercury Mountaineer 

The Ford Explorer was sold by the Mercury division as the Mercury Mountaineer from 1997 until 2010. Developed as a competitor for the Oldsmobile Bravada, the Mountaineer was a four-door SUV slotted above the Explorer Limited. Marking the reintroduction of the waterfall grille to the Mercury brand, the model line was distinguished by two-tone (and later monochromatic) styling different from the Explorer.

Coinciding with the 2010 closure of the Mercury brand, the Mountaineer was withdrawn after the 2010 model year; three generations were produced, with the Mountaineer serving as the largest Mercury SUV (above the Mariner).

Lincoln Aviator 

The Ford Explorer has been sold twice by the Lincoln division as the Lincoln Aviator. From 2003 through 2005, the Lincoln Aviator was marketed as a counterpart of the third-generation Explorer. The first mid-size SUV sold by Lincoln, the model line was slotted between the Mercury Mountaineer and the Lincoln Navigator. Following the introduction of the fourth-generation Explorer, the model line was repackaged as a CUV based on the Ford Edge and renamed the Lincoln MKX (today the Lincoln Nautilus).

For 2020, the Lincoln Aviator was revived (after a 14-year hiatus) as a mid-size SUV; as before, the model line is a Lincoln counterpart of the Ford Explorer (now the sixth generation) and the Lincoln Navigator. The second-generation Aviator is the first Lincoln vehicle offered with plug-in hybrid capability as an option; its  combined output is the highest-ever for a Lincoln vehicle.

Export sales

UK models
In the UK, the Ford Explorer was initially available as just one model, with the 4.0 L engine and with a high specification – the only dealer options being a leather interior. Second and third-generation Explorers for the UK and other RHD markets utilized a center console-mounted shifter and hand parking brake instead of the steering column-mounted shifter and parking brake pedal used in the North American models. In 1998, a facelifted Explorer was available with minor cosmetic interior changes and a revised rear tail lift that centered the rear number plate. In 1999 the model range was revamped slightly, the base model becoming the XLT and a special edition North Face version marketed with a tie-in to North Face outdoor clothing. The North Face version was available in dark green or silver, with body-colored bumpers, heated leather seats, and a CD multichanger as standard. In 2000, the North Face was also available in black.

Middle East and Asia
In Korea, the Middle East, Taiwan, and China, the 2012 Ford Explorer was available in several trims, all with a 3.5 L V6 engine and an automatic gearbox. Some GCC markets offer the front-wheel-drive version as a base model, while most of the trims have standard all-wheel-drive. The latest generation Explorer was made available in Japan the Fall of 2015.

Exports
As of 2009, the Explorer is also sold in Bolivia, Chile, Canada, Mexico, Panama, the Dominican Republic, Japan, South Korea, Israel, the Republic of China (Taiwan), The Philippines, Turkey, Russia, Iceland, Germany, the Middle East, and certain countries in South America and Africa.

As of 2014, the Explorer is also available in Ukraine and Belarus. As of 2018, American-made Explorers are also exported to Vietnam.

Criticism and controversies

Rollover and Firestone Tire controversy

240 deaths and 3,000 catastrophic injuries resulted from the combination of early-generation Explorers and Firestone tires. The tire tread separated and the vehicle had an unusually high rate of rollover crash as a result. Both companies' reputations were tarnished. This event led to a disruption in the 90-year-old Ford/Firestone partnership.

Rollover risk is inherently higher in truck-based vehicles, like the Explorer, than in ordinary passenger cars, as a modification for bulky 4-wheel-drive hardware requires increases in height to avoid compromising ground clearance (raising the center of gravity), while a short wheelbase further reduces stability. The previous Bronco II had already been cited by Consumer Reports for rollover tendencies in turns.

The Explorer was cleared by the NHTSA as no more dangerous than any other truck when driven unsafely. It used the same tires as the Ford Ranger with a relatively low rating for high temperatures. Lowering tire pressure recommendations softened the ride further and improved emergency stability through increased traction, but increased the chances of overheating tires. A 1995 redesign with a new suspension slightly raised the Explorer's center of gravity, but it was called inconsequential by a Ford spokesman. Memos by Ford engineers suggested lowering the engine height, but it would have increased the cost of the new design.

Explorer rollover rates, at the time of the controversy, were higher than any of its competitors. While Firestone turned out millions of sub-standard and potentially defective tires and was the initial cause of loss of control on many Ford Explorer Firestone tire tread separation rollovers, the blame shifted towards Ford for a defectively designed and unstable vehicle.

In May 2000, the US National Highway Traffic Safety Administration (NHTSA) contacted Ford and Firestone about a higher-than-normal incidence of tire failures on Ford Explorers, Mercury Mountaineers, and Mazda Navajos fitted with Firestone tires (later including Ford Ranger and Mazda B-Series pickup trucks). The failures all involved tread separation, in which the outer tread carcass would delaminate and cause a rapid loss of tire pressure. Ford investigated and found that several models of  Firestone tires (ATX, ATX II, and Wilderness AT) had higher failure rates, especially those made at Firestone's Decatur, Illinois plant.

Ford recommended tire inflation of only  likely contributing to the tread separation problem by causing the tires to operate at higher than normal temperatures.

Ford argued that Firestone was at fault, noting that the tires made by Firestone were very defective.

Some have argued that poor driver reaction to tire blowouts was a contributing factor. When a tire blew, the vehicle would experience a sudden sharp jerk, and many drivers reacted by counter-steering in an attempt to regain control. According to Forbes magazine, car experts and NHTSA claim that the vast majority of crash accidents and deaths were caused not by the vehicle, but by the driver, by road conditions or some combination of the two. Many vehicle injury attorneys dissent from this view.

In response to Firestone's allegations of the Explorer's design defects, NHTSA undertook a preliminary investigation and reported that further action was not required. Its conclusion was that the Explorer was no more prone to rollover than other SUVs given their high center of gravity. The subsequent introduction and proliferation of electronic stability control systems have essentially addressed and mitigated this shortcoming.

In May 2001, Ford announced it would replace 13 million Firestone tires fitted to Explorer vehicles.

U-Haul trailers
On December 22, 2003, U-Haul, the largest American equipment rental company, announced it would prohibit its outlets from renting trailers to persons planning to tow behind Ford Explorers due to liability concerns, with no published data to substantiate the claim. Unofficial reports from employees indicated that it was due to the rear bumper separating from the vehicle, including the tow hook assembly. U-Haul did not alter its policies regarding the renting of trailers to persons planning to tow behind the Mercury Mountaineer, Mazda Navajo or earlier versions of the Lincoln Aviator, which are all mechanically identical to the Ford Explorer. In mid-2013, U-Haul began allowing Ford Explorers of model year 2011 and newer to tow their trailers. All other Ford Motor Company vehicles are allowed to tow U-Haul trailers.

Reliability
The 4.0 L SOHC V6 engine found on second, third, and fourth generation Explorers was notorious for the plastic OEM timing chain guides, cassettes, and tensioners breaking resulting in timing chain ticking, rattle or "death rattle". This problem can occur as early as 45,000 mi (72,000 km) in some vehicles. When the engine is running for an extended period of time with this issue, the engine can jump timing or cease running, damaging the heads and valves.

Timing chain rattle was mitigated in later years of the SOHC (in most vehicles, after 2002) with updated cassettes and tensioners.

The 5R55 series transmissions found on second through fourth-generation Explorers were also notorious for premature failures. Common issues with this transmission include but are not limited to servo pin bore wear, premature transmission case wear, and excessive valve body wear.

Water pumps on 2011 through 2019 Ford Explorer and 2013 through 2019 Ford Police Interceptor Utility equipped with the 3.5 L V6, 3.5 L EcoBoost V6, and 3.7 L V6 have a tendency to fail and potentially ruin the engine when they do. The water pumps on these engines are internally mounted and driven by the timing chain. As a result, when they fail, antifreeze is dumped directly into the crankcase; mixing with engine oil and potentially damaging the head gaskets and connecting rod bearings. Many of these water pump failures occur without warning and repairs often cost thousands of dollars as the engine needs to be disassembled or removed from the vehicle to access the water pump. In some cases, the engine will need to be replaced outright. A class-action lawsuit was started against Ford as a result of this issue. In 2020 the class-action lawsuit was dismissed with prejudice by a judge stating the plaintiffs failed to present any arguments that Ford knew or should have known the water pumps were defective.

Sales

See also

Ford Explorer Sport Trac
Mercury Mountaineer
Lincoln Aviator
Saleen XP6
Saleen XP8
Firestone and Ford tire controversy

References

External links

Ford Explorer America Concept SUV at Ford Auto Shows
Ford Explorer America Concept SUV at Ford Digital Snippets
History of the first Ford Explorer
Serious Explorations – Ford Explorer Enthusiast Website

Explorer
All-wheel-drive vehicles
Crossover sport utility vehicles
Mid-size sport utility vehicles
Ford Police Interceptor Utility
Rear-wheel-drive vehicles
Flexible-fuel vehicles
2000s cars
2010s cars
2020s cars
Cars introduced in 1990
Motor vehicles manufactured in the United States